Thabo Qalinge (born 28 August 1991) is a South African soccer player who last played for AmaZulu F.C. in the Premier Soccer League.

Career statistics

References

1991 births
Living people
Sportspeople from Soweto
South African soccer players
National First Division players
South African Premier Division players
SuperSport United F.C. players
Mpumalanga Black Aces F.C. players
Orlando Pirates F.C. players
AmaZulu F.C. players
Association football midfielders